Deskle is a settlement on the left bank of the Soča River, opposite Anhovo, in the Municipality of Kanal ob Soči in the Littoral region of Slovenia.

The parish church in the settlement is dedicated to Saint George and belongs to the Diocese of Koper.

References

External links
Deskle on Geopedia
Deskle on the Kanal Tourist Information site

Populated places in the Municipality of Kanal
Populated places in the Soča Valley